The State Crown of Mary of Modena is the consort crown made in 1685 for Mary of Modena, queen of England, Scotland and Ireland. It was used by future queens consort up until the end of the 18th century.

Originally set with hired diamonds, the crown is set with crystals for display in the Jewel House at the Tower of London.

Mary also had a diadem, also in the Jewel House, and a coronation crown, now owned by the Museum of London.

Description
The gold crown originally had 523 small diamonds, 38 large diamonds, and 129 large pearls. These have been replaced with quartz crystals. The crown is decorated with crosses pattée and fleurs-de-lis and has four half-arches, surmounted with a monde and cross pattée.

Origin

Traditionally, when a king is married, his wife is crowned as queen at their coronation ceremony. In 1649, the monarchy was abolished after a long civil war between Charles I and his Parliament, and the Crown Jewels were either sold or turned into coins by the Mint. The coronation of Mary of Modena and her husband, James II and VII, marked the first time a queen was crowned after the restoration of the monarchy, Charles II having been unmarried when he took the throne in 1660.

Three pieces of headgear were made for the queen: a diadem to wear in procession to Westminster Abbey, a coronation crown for the crowning, and a state crown to wear upon leaving the Abbey. Made by Richard de Beauvoir, the state crown was covered in diamonds valued at £35,000, and the bill for hiring them was £1,000. She paid for the crowns and diadem out of her own pocket, and also commissioned two new sceptres and a coronation ring for the ceremony.

Mary's diadem was set with 177 diamonds, 78 pearls, 1 sapphire, 1 emerald, and 1 ruby; it now contains artificial gemstones and cultured pearls, and is also on display at the Tower of London.

Her empty coronation crown was acquired from a private dealer by the Museum of London in 1956. It had been sent to the Crown Jewellers, Rundell & Bridge, for maintenance work in the 19th century, but was never returned to the Royal family.

Usage
The crown was subsequently used by queens regnant Mary II and Anne; and by queens consort Caroline of Ansbach and Charlotte of Mecklenburg-Strelitz. In 1831, the crown was judged to be too theatrical and in a poor state of repair, and so another crown was made for the new queen, Adelaide of Saxe-Meiningen. However, it is possible that Adelaide was crowned using one of Mary of Modena's crowns.

See also
Crown of Queen Elizabeth The Queen Mother
Crown of Queen Mary
Crown of Queen Alexandra
Crown of Queen Adelaide

References

Bibliography

External links

1685 works
Crown Jewels of the United Kingdom
Mary of Modena
Mary of Modena